Agrupación Deportiva Torrejón was a football club based in Torrejón de Ardoz, Community of Madrid. The club came to play 6 seasons in Segunda División B. AD Torrejón disappears in 2002 when merges with Torrejón CF to form the current AD Torrejón CF.

Season to season

6 seasons in Segunda División B
15 seasons in Tercera División

Famous players
 Marcos Machín

Defunct football clubs in the Community of Madrid
Association football clubs established in 1953
Association football clubs disestablished in 2002
1953 establishments in Spain
2002 disestablishments in Spain
Sport in Torrejón de Ardoz